Lists of Lights and Buoys is Norwegian group Susanna and the Magical Orchestra's debut, released in 2004. It is mostly known for the duo's very personal interpretation of Dolly Parton's Jolene, but also contains several tracks written by the band.

Track listing

Personnel 
Susanna Karolina Wallumrød - vocals
Morten Qvenild - keyboards, harmonium and autoharp
Andreas Mjøs - vibraphone, guitar, timpani, programming and additional electronics

Notes 
Written by Morten Qvenild (tracks #3, #8-9 & #11)
Written by Susanna Karolina Wallumrød (tracks #4-7 & #10)
Programming and additional electronics at rotoscope studio and sunshine sound productions
Mixed & mastered by Helge Sten
Produced by Deathprod
Produced by Andreas Mjøs
Recorded By – Audun Borrmann, Sjur Miljeteig
Additional recording by Andreas Mjøs (track #11)
Additional recording by Christian Snilsberg & Morten Qvenild
Sleeve by Kim Hiorthoy

References 

2004 debut albums
Susanna and the Magical Orchestra albums
Susanna Wallumrød albums